Paramount Chief Kinyanjui Technical Institute (PCKTTI) is a collegiate public, technical institute in Nairobi Kenya. PC Kinyanjui was founded in 1979 with a total of 1,500 students. The vision of starting the school was established by Jomo Kenyatta, the first president of the republic of Kenya.
PC Kinyanjui was then upgraded to a technical collegiate institution in 1987 and offers a variety of courses including Engineering education, Business education, Hospitality, ICT. Mrs.Hilda Omwoyo Chief Principal of the institution. PC Kinyanjui Technical Training Institute is accredited by TVET (Technical and Vocational Education and Training) as a technical training institution.

Academic departments and faculties
 Mechanical engineering
 Information technology (ICT) and information science
 Applied science
 Hospitality
 Building and construction engineering
 Business and entrepreneurship
 Civil and architectural engineering
 Electrical and Electronics engineering

Location
The PC Kinyanjui Technical Training Institute is located on Kabiria Road in Riruta satellite Dagoretti South Constituency in the county of Nairobi.

History
PC kinyanjui was founded in 1979 as a technical secondary school and named Kinyanjui in honour of Kinyanjui wa Gathirimu, who was chief of the area between 1893 and 1929.

See also
Ngong Technical and Vocational College
Technical University of Mombasa
Rift Valley Technical Training Institute

References

External links
PC Kinyanjui Technical Training Institute

Universities and colleges in Kenya
1979 establishments in Kenya
Educational institutions established in 1979